Ammo Aziza Baroud (born August 4, 1965) is a Chadian politician who has served as Minister for Health and the Permanent Representative to the United Nations since 2019.

Life
Baroud was born on 4 August 1965.

In September she became the Minister for Health under President Idriss Deby.

In 2019 she was the Ambassador of Chad to the European Union, the United Kingdom, and the Benelux countries. On 27 December 2019 Moustapha Ali Alifei who was Chad's Permanent Representative to the United Nations was  recalled. Presidential decree appointed Baroud to replace him. She would be based in New York.

In 2020 during the Coronavirus Pandemic Baroud was assisting First Lady Hinda Déby and Diego Canga Fano as they discussed business opportunities in Chad with European investors.

References

1965 births
Living people
Health ministers of Chad
21st-century Chadian women politicians
21st-century Chadian politicians